Kessleria pyrenaea is a moth of the family Yponomeutidae. It is found in France.

The length of the forewings is 7 mm for females. The forewings are brownish grey with whitish scales. The hindwings are dark greyish brown. Adults have been recorded in mid July.

References

Moths described in 1960
Yponomeutidae
Moths of Europe